Volodymyr Vasylovych Saldo (born 12 June 1956) is a Russian and former Ukrainian politician serving as the head of the collaborationist Kherson military–civilian administration in Russian-occupied Ukraine since 26 April 2022.

Early life and engineering career
Saldo was born on 12 June 1956 in the town of Zhovtneve, Mykolaiv Oblast, in what was then Ukrainian Soviet Socialist Republic of the Soviet Union. In 1978 he graduated from the Kryvyi Rih Mining Institute with a degree in industrial and civil construction. He specialized as a civil engineer and earned a PhD in economics in 2008. From 1978 to 2001, he worked as an engineer and head of installation departments at the Khersonpromstroy plant.

Political career in Ukraine

Kherson City Councillor (1998–2002)
Saldo was elected to the Kherson City Council in 1998 and served until 2002. In 2001, he joined the Party of Regions and was named the head of its branch in Kherson Oblast.

Deputy Governor of Kherson Oblast (2001-2002)
In 2001, he was named deputy governor of Kherson Oblast, in charge of construction, housing and communal services, and served until 2002.

Mayor of Kherson (2002–2012)
Saldo was elected mayor of Kherson in 2002, and re-elected in 2006 and 2010, serving until 2012. In 2006, he was named the head of the Party of Regions branch in Kherson city. The Association for the Reintegration of Crimea reported after the Russian invasion of Ukraine in March 2022 that Saldo's ten-year mayoralty was a "time of total embezzlement and corruption that entangled all spheres of the city's life, at times grandiose scandals".

People's Deputy of Ukraine (2012–2015)

Saldo was elected a People's Deputy of Ukraine in the 2012 Ukrainian parliamentary elections and served until 2015. Following his election, he was named the deputy chairman of the Verkhovna Rada's committee for construction, urban planning, housing and communal services and regional policy. He voted for the set of anti-protest laws, also called the "dictatorship laws", on 16 January 2014.
Since 2014, he has been serving as the chairman of the board of the Kherson City Public Association of Builders and Investors.

Kherson City Councillor (2015–2022)
In 2015, he ran for Mayor of Kherson as a member of the Our Land party. He finished second in the first round with 16.88%, and withdrew from the second round, citing pressure on himself, but was elected to the Kherson City Council once again. In 2019, he founded the Volodymyr Saldo Bloc political party, and in 2020 was re-elected to the City Council, while finishing second in the mayoral election again, losing to Ihor Kolykhaiev.

Collaboration with Russia during the 2022 invasion of Ukraine

Initial Russian occupation of Kherson (2022) 
Following the 2022 Russian invasion of Ukraine, Saldo took a pro-Russian position. On 13 March, he took part in a pro-Russian rally in Kherson. However, Saldo stated that he did not support the creation of a "people's republic" in the Kherson Oblast, and claimed his collaborationism was driven by a desire to maintain Kherson as part of Ukraine.

The head of the Volodymyr Saldo Bloc on the Kherson Oblast Council, Valery Lytvyn, sent a letter to the first deputy chairman of the Oblast Council Yuriy Sobolevsky, stating that the deputies did not agree with Saldo's choice to attend the 13 March rally. Deputies of the bloc announced that they would continue their activities in the Kherson Oblast Council as part of a new faction, titled the "Support to the programs of the President of Ukraine" faction.

Saldo received attention following his participation in a meeting of the Salvation Committee for Peace and Order, a Russian-established government organ in Kherson Oblast. Following the meeting, Olga Spivakina, a deputy of the city council, posted Saldo's statement on Facebook, in which he claimed that he had been taken captive and forced to participate in the meeting.

On 17 March, the Office of the Prosecutor General of Ukraine opened proceedings on treason related to the "creation of a pseudo-authority in the Kherson Oblast," with Saldo as a prime suspect in the case. Saldo's aide Pavel Slobodchikov was assassinated in Kherson on 20 March.

The Volodymyr Saldo Bloc party's activities were suspended by the National Security and Defense Council on 20 March, for having ties to Russia. On 14 June the Eighth Administrative Court of Appeal banned the party's activities.

Russian-appointed governor of Kherson Oblast (2022–present) 

Saldo was appointed governor of Kherson Oblast by the Russian military on 26 April 2022. Following a Ukrainian missile attack on Kherson on 27 April, Saldo stated that "Kyiv abandoned people from Kherson". On 29 April, Saldo stated that official languages in the Kherson Oblast will be both Ukrainian and Russian, and that the International Settlements Bank from South Ossetia would soon open 200 branches in Kherson Oblast. On 29 April the Ukrainian prosecutor pressed treason charges against Saldo for his collaborationism.

On 6 May 2022, Saldo met with Denis Pushilin, head of the Donetsk People's Republic, and Andrey Turchak, secretary of the general council of United Russia. During an interview on the same day, Saldo stated that Kherson Oblast was already an "integral part of the big family of Russia".

On 3 June 2022, he was sanctioned by the European Union due to his role in the Russian occupation of Kherson Oblast and for providing support and promoting policies that undermine the territorial integrity, sovereignty and independence of Ukraine. On 11 June, he received a Russian passport, and was quoted as saying "For me, this is a truly historic moment. I have always thought that we [Ukraine and Russia] are one country and one people."

On 5 August, Russian authorities announced that Saldo would be transferred to Moscow for medical treatment, after a "Minister of Health" approached him insisting on a medical examination by doctors on hand in his office, against his will. Following his departure to Russia, he was replaced by Sergei Yeliseyev. It was initially reported by RT that Saldo had suffered from a stroke and was comatose, but this was denied by Saldo's deputy Kirill Stremousov, who claimed that such reports were, "part of Ukraine's information war against Russia." Some reports said he was poisoned on that day. According to Russian (RIA Novosti and Lenta.ru) and Ukrainian media reports, on September 12, Saldo died in intensive care after alleged poisoning. Soon, articles in the Russian media about his death were deleted. Kirill Stremousov also wrote about the death of Saldo, but then deleted the post. On 19 September 2022, Ria Novosti reported that Saldo had returned to "fulfilling his duties".

On September 30, together with the other pro-Russian occupation heads Denis Pushilin, Leonid Pasechnik and Yevgeny Balitsky, Saldo attended in Moscow the ceremony in which Vladimir Putin formally announced the annexation of the Donetsk, Kherson, Luhansk and Zaporizhzhia oblasts.

In late October, as Ukrainian troops advanced on Kherson, Saldo's administration ordered all residents to evacuate the city. On November 8, just before Russian troops announced their withdrawal, Saldo's Deputy Kirill Stremousov was killed in a car crash. After Ukrainian troops retook Kherson, the pro-Russian administration centre was temporarily relocated to Henichesk.

On 20 December 2022, President Putin awarded Saldo the Order "For Merit to the Fatherland". On 22 December, Saldo announced plans to build a new city on the Arabat Spit.

In early January 2023, the Ukrainian State Bureau of Investigation and the Kherson Oblast prosecutor's office raided Saldo's home. According to their findings, Saldo had been given direct orders from Russian higher-ups to commit crimes against Ukraine. Information was also uncovered about the structure of the occupation regime and salaries paid in rubles.

Controversies

2016 debtor assault
In 2016, Saldo was held in the Dominican Republic for three months after he was accused of kidnapping and torturing a 33-year-old Ukrainian man who allegedly owed him and his partner $334,000.

2022 sanctions
In 2015, he bought part of the Czech company Agriatis, mostly owned by his Ukrainian partner Volodymyr Erekhynskyi. Following the placement of EU sanctions in June 2022 for collaborating with Russia, the Czech Ministry of Finance announced that they had launched an investigation into his ownership.

Honours

Orders

Notes

References

External links 
 Volodymyr Saldo, official Facebook page
 Ex-mayor of Kherson Saldo, detained earlier in the Dominican Republic, returned to Ukraine

1956 births
Living people
Ukrainian politicians
Party of Regions politicians
Mayors of places in Ukraine
Governors of Kherson Oblast
Ukrainian collaborators with Russia during the 2022 Russian invasion of Ukraine
Our Land (Ukraine) politicians
People from Mykolaiv Oblast
Seventh convocation members of the Verkhovna Rada
Volodymyr Saldo Bloc politicians
Kryvyi Rih National University alumni
Anti-Ukrainian sentiment in Ukraine
Mayors of Kherson
Recipients of the Order "For Merit to the Fatherland", 3rd class